Christine Görner (born 15 June 1930) is a German opera singer (soprano) and actress.

Life and career 
After her vocal training Görner was engaged at the age of 22 by the Staatsoper Hamburg. After a few years she went to Munich to the Staatstheater am Gärtnerplatz. There she appeared in Fanny (with Trude Hesterberg), the first musical which was produced at Gärtnerplatz, as well as Miesmies in the premiere of the play opera Spiegel, das Kätzchen (with Ferry Gruber),among others. She performed at the Cologne Opera, the Deutsche Oper Berlin and the Bayerische Staatsoper.

In the 1950s she was also active as an actress and performed leading roles in several film productions parallel to her stage appearances. In 1958 she played the title role in the operetta movie Countess Maritza. From 1988 Görner worked mainly as an acting and singing teacher (voice coaching), first for five years at the acting school of Ruth von Zerboni, later in her own studio. She was also successful as a performer of songs by Kurt Weill and Bertolt Brecht as well as of chansons of the 1920s, and also in radio and television appearances.

Discography (partial) 
 Operettenquerschnitte, with Benno Kusche (EMI)
 The Merry Farmer/Der Vogelhändler, with Benno Kusche (Amiga)
 Robert Stolz - Meine schönsten Melodien, with Benno Kusche (Europa)
 Christine Görner - Benno Kusche (Telefunken)
 Weltstars singen Lehár (Electrola)
 Ein Sommer lang/In mir klingt ein Lied (Telefunken)

Filmography 
 1958: Wenn Mädchen ins Manöver zieh’n
 1958: 
 1958: Zauber der Montur
 1958: Gräfin Mariza
 1959: Zwischen Glück und Krone
 1959: 
 1959: Mandolins and Moonlight
 1959:  
 1959: What a Woman Dreams of in Springtime
 1960: Final Destination: Red Lantern

References

External links 
 
 Christine Görner Homepage
 
 

German operatic sopranos
German musical theatre actresses
German film actresses
1930 births
Living people
Halle
20th-century German women  opera singers